Golan Cipel (born 1968) is an Israeli consultant most known for his relationship with former New Jersey Governor Jim McGreevey.

Biography
Cipel was born in Tel Aviv in 1968 and grew up in the city of Rishon LeZion.

Cipel served in the Israel Defense Forces (IDF) for five years as a naval officer, eventually rising to the rank of lieutenant. Following his service in the Israeli Navy, Cipel held several positions in government. He began his career in 1992 as parliamentary aide in the Israeli Parliament, the Knesset, where he was responsible for policy formation, as well as the drafting of legislation. In 1994 he joined the Israeli Ministry of Foreign Affairs as chief information officer at the Consulate General of Israel in New York, where he was responsible for presenting the Israeli government perspective to the American media and public. In 1999, Cipel was appointed the spokesperson for the municipality of Rishon LeZion, Israel.

In 2001, Cipel returned to the United States to work on the New Jersey gubernatorial campaign of Jim McGreevey. Following the election, Cipel was appointed counselor to the governor, advising McGreevey on issues including political strategy, diplomatic affairs and Jewish community relations. He also served as liaison between the states's various security and law enforcement agencies and the governor's office.

McGreevey and Cipel were having an affair in secret, something that would later lead to McGreevey's resignation as governor.

Cipel currently works as an independent marketing consultant. He holds a bachelor's degree and a master's degree in communications arts from the New York Institute of Technology.

Relationship with McGreevey
McGreevey met Cipel while on a junket to Israel in 2000. Cipel was working as a public affairs officer for a municipal government. Cipel later moved to New Jersey in order to provide outreach to the Jewish community on behalf of McGreevey's gubernatorial campaign.

McGreevey eventually appointed Cipel as a counselor to the governor, a position from which he resigned in August 2002 to take a position at the public relations firm MWW.

Cipel's intention to file a sexual harassment lawsuit against McGreevey in Mercer County Court led to McGreevey's decision to resign as governor on August 12, 2004.

Cipel dropped the lawsuit after McGreevey resigned, stating that justice had been served.

Cipel's version
In an interview with the Israeli newspaper Ha'aretz (August 19, 2004), Cipel stated that his situation was intentionally misrepresented by the governor's office and affirmed that he had never actually been responsible for internal security under the governor.

According to Cipel, the press had distorted his history, transforming him from someone who had self-published a book of poetry at age sixteen into a "poet".  He claims such distortions supported the story that McGreevey allegedly created and the press eagerly covered.

In his own words, Cipel claims he was one of many victims of McGreevey's sexual harassment, that he had "no romantic affair" with the governor, but rather was taken advantage of. He also describes the former governor's behavior as egotistical, unprofessional, immoral, and immature.

References

External links
 Golan Cipel's official web site

1968 births
Living people
Israeli Jews
People from New Jersey
People from Tel Aviv